Tordoia is a municipality in the Spanish province of A Coruña. It has a population of 4847 (Spanish 2001 Census) and an area of 125 km².

Municipalities in the Province of A Coruña